Daicos is a surname. Notable people with the surname include:

 Josh Daicos (born 1998), Australian rules footballer
 Nick Daicos (born 2003), Australian rules footballer
 Peter Daicos (born 1961), Australian rules footballer